Erik Peterson Grandjean (7 June 1890 – 26 October 1960) was a German theologian and Christian archeologist.

Biography
Erik Peterson was born in Hamburg. He studied theology from 1910 to 1914 in Strasbourg, Greifswald, Berlin, Basel and Göttingen, where he defended his doctoral dissertation in 1926. He was initially an evangelical Christian influenced by pietism and Søren Kierkegaard. Through the influence of phenomenology in Göttingen, Edmund Husserl, Adolf Reinach, Hedwig Conrad-Martius, Hans Lipps, Theodor Haecker, Max Scheler, Carl Schmitt, Jacques Maritain and the Liturgical Movement, he opened up to the Catholic world. He converted to Catholicism in 1930 and settled in Munich then Rome. In 1947 he became professor of church history and patrology at the Pontifical Institute for Christian Archaeology in Rome. In 1960, the year of his death, he received honorary doctorates from the University of Bonn (Ph.D.) and the University of Munich (Th.D.).

He wrote critically about National Socialism and its political theology as defined by Carl Schmitt, notably in the 1935 essay "Monotheism as a Political Problem". His most prominent theological writings are collected in Theological Tractates (German 1951, English 2011) and meditative texts are found in Marginalien zur Theologie (1956).

References

External links

 Stanford University Press: Theological Tractates
   Christophe Schmidt, "The Return of the Katechon: Giorgio Agamben contra Erik Peterson"

1890 births
1960 deaths
Writers from Hamburg
20th-century German Protestant theologians
20th-century German Catholic theologians
Biblical archaeology
Converts to Roman Catholicism from Evangelicalism
German expatriates in Italy
Political theologians